Chomp is a two-player game played on a rectangular chocolate bar made up of smaller square blocks.

Chomp or CHOMP may also refer to:

Arts and entertainment

Titled works
 Chomp (album) by Pylon
 Chomp (novel), by Carl Hiaasen
 C.H.O.M.P.S., a 1979 film directed by Don Chaffey

Fictional characters
 Chomp (Mario), or Chain Chomp, in the Mario video game series
 Chomp, in the arcade game Dinosaur King
 Chomp, a robot on BattleBots
Chomp, mascot for Discovery Kids

Other uses
 Biting
 Chomp (chocolate bar)
 Chomp (search engine)
 chomp, a Perl function; See Trimming
 Community Hospital of the Monterey Peninsula, California, US

See also
 Chomp-Chomp, in Pac-Man